Acabyara aruama is a species of beetle in the family Cerambycidae, the only species in the genus Acabyara.

References

Compsocerini